The American Samoa women's national football team represents the country of American Samoa in women's international association football. It is fielded by Football Federation American Samoa, the governing body of football in American Samoa, and competes as a member of the Oceania Football Confederation (OFC), which encompasses the countries of Oceania. American Samoa played their first international match on 9 October 1998 in a 21–0 loss to Australia in Auckland.

American Samoa have competed in numerous competitions, and all players who have played in at least one international match, either as a member of the starting eleven or as a substitute, are listed below. Each player's details include his playing position while with the team, the number of caps earned and goals scored in all international matches, and details of the first and most recent matches played in. The names are initially ordered by number of caps (in descending order), then by date of debut, then by alphabetical order. All statistics are correct up to and including the match played on 15 July 2019.

Key

Players

References

American Samoa women's international footballers
Association football player non-biographical articles
American Samoa